Guadalupe Mountains National Park is an American national park in the Guadalupe Mountains, east of El Paso, Texas. The ruins of a stagecoach station stand near the Pine Springs visitor center. The restored Frijole Ranch contains a small museum of local history and is the trailhead for Smith Spring.

The McKittrick Canyon trail leads to a stone cabin built in the early 1930s as the vacation home of Wallace Pratt, a petroleum geologist who donated the land. Dog Canyon, on the northern park boundary at the Texas-New Mexico State line, is accessed via Carlsbad, New Mexico or Dell City, Texas. Camping is available at the Pine Springs campground and at Dog Canyon. A public corral for livestock is available by reservation. The park observes Mountain Time.

The Gypsum sand dunes lie on the west side of the park near Dell City. A rough four-wheel drive road leads to the Williams Ranch.

Park purpose
As stated in the foundation document:

History

The Guadalupe Mountains give their name to the Guadalupian series in the Permian period. The International Commission on Stratigraphy estimates the mountain range's age at 272–260 Mya. The mountains have had a tumultuous history for thousands of years. Archaeological evidence shows that people have lived there for over 10,000 years in and among the many caves and alcoves. Hunter-gatherers followed large game and collected edible vegetation, as evidenced by the discovery of projectile points, baskets, pottery and rock art.

The first Europeans to arrive in the area were the Spanish in the 16th century, but they did not make serious attempts to settle in the area. The Spanish introduced horses; nomadic indigenous tribes like the Apaches soon found them an asset for hunting and migrating. Mescalero Apaches followed game and harvested the agave (or mescal) for food and fiber (Mescalero is Spanish for mescal-maker). Agave roasting pits and other artifacts of Mescalero culture can be found in the park.

The Mescalero Apaches occupied the mountains through the mid-19th century, but were challenged by an American transportation route at the end of the American Civil War. During the 1840s and 1850s, many immigrants travelled west crossed the area. In 1858, Pinery Station was constructed near Pine Springs for the Butterfield Overland Mail. The 9th Cavalry Regiment was ordered to the area to stop Indian raids on settlements and the mail stage route. During the winter of 1869, Lt. H.B. Cushing led his troops into the Guadalupe Mountains and destroyed two Mescalero Apache camps. They were eventually driven out of the area and into US reservations.

Felix McKittrick was one of the first European settlers in the Guadalupe Mountains; he worked cattle during the 1870s. McKittrick Canyon is thought to be named after him. Frijole Ranch was the first permanent ranch house, constructed in 1876 by the Rader brothers. It became the only major building in the region and served as a community center and regional post office from 1916 to 1942. Today, it has been restored and serves as a cultural museum. In 1908  Williams Ranch House was built, and it was named after one of its inhabitants, James Adolphus Williams. Judge J.C. Hunter from Van Horn, Texas consolidated most of the smaller ranches in the area into the Guadalupe Mountain Ranch.

In 1921, Wallace Pratt, a geologist for Humble Oil and Refining Company, was impressed by the beauty of McKittrick Canyon and bought the land to build two houses there. Both were used as summer homes by Pratt and his family up until 1960.

In 1978, the United States Congress designated 46,850 acres (190 km2) of the park as a wilderness area.

Geography

The range lies southeast of the Sacramento Mountains and east of the Brokeoff Mountains. The mountain range extends north-northwest and northeast from Guadalupe Peak in Texas into New Mexico. The Guadalupe Mountains are surrounded by the South Plains to the east and north, Delaware Mountains to the south, and Sacramento Mountains to the west.

The northwestern extension, bounded by a dramatic escarpment known as "The Rim", extends much further into New Mexico, approaching close to the Sacramento Mountains. The range is bordered on the north by Four Mile Canyon; on the east by the valley of the Pecos River; and on the west by Piñon Creek, Big Dog Canyon, Valley Canyon, Middle Dog Canyon and West Dog Canyon. Much of the range is built from the ancient Capitán Reef, formed at the margins of a shallow sea during the Permian Period. As the range is built up almost entirely of limestone, upland areas have little or no surface water. The only significant surface water is McKittrick Creek, in McKittrick Canyon, which emerges from the eastern side of the massif, just south of the New Mexico border. Several peaks on the southern end exceed .

Climate
According to the Köppen climate classification system, Guadalupe Mountains National Park has a cold semi-arid climate (BSk). The plant hardiness zone on Guadalupe Peak is 7b with an average annual extreme minimum temperature of 6.1 °F (-14.4 °C).

The Guadalupe Mountains experience relatively hot summers, calm, mild autumn weather, and cool to cold weather in winter and early spring. Snow storms, sleet storms, freezing rain, or fog may occur in winter or early spring. Frequent high wind warnings are issued during winter through spring. Late summer monsoons produce thunderstorms. Nights are cool, even in summer.

Ecology

Three major ecosystems are contained within the park. The Chihuahuan Desert exhibits salt flats, creosote bushes, and honey mesquite on the western side of the park, with low elevations on the eastern side covered with grassland, pinyon pine, and junipers. The canyon interiors, including McKittrick, Bear, and Pine Springs Canyon, exhibit bigtooth maple, velvet ash, chinkapin oak, and other deciduous trees that are fed by springs recharged by mountain streams.

The range contains many large cave systems, including Carlsbad Caverns and Lechuguilla Cave. The history of the range includes occupation by ancient Pueblo and Mogollon peoples, and by the Apache and various outlaws in the 19th century.

Flora
Viola guadalupensis, the Guadalupe Mountains violet, is a rare plant that is only endemic to the park.

Fauna
Mammals that inhabit this national park include elk, javelina, gray fox, American black bear, coyote, bobcat, striped and hog-nosed skunk, badger, sixteen species of bat, mule deer, and mountain lion. Birds of this park include great horned owl, chickadee, sparrow, woodpecker, turkey vulture, greater roadrunner, hummingbird, peregrine falcon, golden eagle, wren, and grosbeak.

See also

List of national parks of the United States
List of birds of Guadalupe Mountains National Park

References

External links

  of the National Park Service
 The entry for Guadalupe Mountains National Park in the Handbook of Texas Online.
 Current weather forecast - National Weather Service
 Visit Carlsbad - Guadalupe Mountains National Park
Film footage of the Guadalupe Mountains National Park in Texas: Land of Contrast (1966) from the Texas Archive of the Moving Image

 
National parks in Texas
Archaeological sites in Texas
Protected areas of Culberson County, Texas
Protected areas of Hudspeth County, Texas
Protected areas established in 1966